The 1905 International Lawn Tennis Challenge was the fifth edition of what is now known as the Davis Cup. As defending champions, the British Isles team played host to the competition. The World Group ties were played at Queen's Club in London, England from 13–19 July, and the final was played on 21–24 July. Britain retained the Cup for their third championship.

Teams
Australasia, a combined Australia-New Zealand team, and Austria joined the competition for the first time. The United States returned after a 1-year hiatus, and France would return for their second year. For the first time, a "World Group" tournament was held to determine which team would challenge the British Isles for the cup.

Draw

Notes
 1. The match was scratched and the United States advanced to the semifinals as Belgium were unable to field a team due to player illness.

Semifinals
France vs. United States

Australasia vs. Austria

Final
United States vs. Australasia

Challenge Round
British Isles vs. United States

References

External links
Davis Cup official website

Davis Cups by year
International Lawn Tennis Challenge
International Lawn Tennis Challenge
International Lawn Tennis Challenge
International Lawn Tennis Challenge
1905 in English tennis